Bryngwran is a village and community in Anglesey Wales, located on the A5 trunk road.

At the 2001 census the community had a population of 781, increasing to 894 at the 2011 census. The village itself has a population of around 400.

Saint Peulan's Church stands in an isolated position at Llanbeulan, in the south east of the community.  A medieval building, it partly dates from the 12th century, but was extended in the 14th, and restored in the mid-19th century.  The gritstone font dates from late 12th century.  It is considered an example of a "rural medieval church retaining its simple character" and is Grade II* listed.  

Pandy Treban, a former fulling mill in the north of the community, and the 18th-century bridge at Pont Factory Cymunod, over the Afon Crigyll on the border with Bodedern, are Grade II listed.

Notable people 
 Alun Michael (born 1943), politician, born in Bryngwran. He served as First Minister of Wales and leader of Welsh Labour from May 1999 to February 2000,  Member of Parliament for Cardiff South and Penarth from 1987 to 2012,  and Police and Crime Commissioner for South Wales since 2012.

Governance
An electoral ward in the same name existed. This stretched beyond the confines of Bryngwran Community with a total population taken at the 2011 census of 1,903. 

Following the Isle of Anglesey (Electoral Arrangements) Order 2012 the ward was amalgamated into a new multi-councillor ward, Canolbarth Môn.

References

External links 

 A Vision of Britain Through Time
 British Listed Buildings
 Genuki
 Geograph
 Office for National Statistics

 
Former wards of Anglesey